Georg Friedrich Karl Heinrich Bidder ( – ) was a Baltic German physiologist and anatomist from what was then the Governorate of Livonia in the Russian Empire.

In 1834 he received his doctorate from the University of Dorpat, where he became a professor of anatomy (1842), and physiology and pathology (1843). He was a corresponding member (1857) and honorary member (1884) of the Saint Petersburg Academy of Sciences (today Russian Academy of Sciences). He was the president of the Naturalists' Society at the University of Dorpat from 1877 to 1890.

Bidder is primarily remembered for his studies of nutrition and gastric physiology. From 1847 to 1852 he performed physiological-chemical studies of digestive juices and metabolism with chemist Carl Ernst Heinrich Schmidt (1822-1894). He also conducted important investigations of the sympathetic nervous system with Alfred Wilhelm Volkmann (1801-1877) and of the spinal cord with Karl Wilhelm von Kupffer (1829-1902).

Bidder's name is associated with two anatomical structures:
 "Bidder's ganglia": Ganglia located at the lower end of the atrial septum; sometimes called the ventricular ganglia.
 "Bidder's organ": A spherical, brownish reproductive organ of male toads.

See also
 List of Baltic German scientists

References
 Physiological-Chemical Research of Bidder and Schmidt
 Official site of Russian Academy of Sciences. Bidder Fridrikh Genrikh
 Russian: Биддер Генрих-Фридрих. Brockhaus and Efron Encyclopedic Dictionary. 1890–1907.
 German: Achard Thomas, Der Physiologe Friedrich Bidder, Zürich, Juris Druck + Verlag, 1969

Further reading

External links
 

1810 births
1894 deaths
People from Smiltene Municipality
People from Kreis Walk
Baltic-German people
Physiologists from the Russian Empire
University of Tartu alumni
Humboldt University of Berlin alumni
Martin Luther University of Halle-Wittenberg alumni
Leipzig University alumni
Academic staff of the University of Tartu
Rectors of the University of Tartu
Corresponding members of the Saint Petersburg Academy of Sciences
Honorary members of the Saint Petersburg Academy of Sciences
Burials at Raadi cemetery
Members of the Göttingen Academy of Sciences and Humanities